M for Montreal (M pour Montréal) is an annual 4-day music event produced by Avalanche Prod, which is held in various venues in Montréal, Québec. It usually takes place in the third weekend of November.

Description
M for Montreal is an independent organization whose mission is to help artists launch their career and/or export their music outside Québec and Canada. It was founded in 2006 by Sebastien Nasra and British festival programmer Martin Elbourne. The festival is divided in two parts: a conference including panels and workshops, and a festival, which showcases close to 100 bands annually. From music buyers to journalists, more than 200 international delegates attend M for Montreal.

Over the years, M for Montreal became a marquee event in Montreal’s cultural scene, as well as a catalyst for the local industry. Past notable acts include: Mac DeMarco, Grimes, Patrick Watson, Half Moon Run, Of Monsters and Men, Coeur de Pirate, Blue Hawaii, M83, The Stills, Pierre Lapointe, Foxtrott, A Tribe Called Red, and many more.

M on the Road
To fulfil its mission, M for Montreal also produces events at South by Southwest (SXSW), The Great Escape Festival, CMJ Music Marathon, Canadian Music Week (CMW), North by Northeast (NXNE), Iceland Airwaves and Festival Les Inrocks in Paris. Additionally, M programs events throughout the year in Montreal, partnering with organizations such as OUMF and Quartier des Spectacles. The festival has also worked with Planète Québec and Québec in Hollywood on events taking place in the United-States.

Lineup

2006 Edition
Patrick Watson, The Besnard Lakes, Galaxie 500, Killa-Jewel, The Lovely Feathers, The Mission District, Taïma

2007 Edition
Chocolat, Plants and Animals, We Are Wolves, Priestess, Torngat, Bloodshot Bill, Les Breastfeeders, Numéro#, Patrick Krief, Shapes and Sizes, Hot Springs, Karkwa, Elsiane, The Stills, Creature, Thunderheist

2008 Edition
Coeur de Pirate, Karkwa, We Are Wolves, Pierre Lapointe, Arkells, Radio Radio, Jon Lajoie, Les Dales Hawerchuk, Sweet Thing, The National Parcs, Duchess Says, Lioness, Pas Chic Chic, Chinatown, Wintergloves, Beast, Woodhands, Claas, Colin Munroe, Red Mass, Gatineau

2009 Edition
Marie-Pierre Arthur, Malajube, Fucked Up, Final Flash, The Luyas, Miracle Fortress, The Rural Alberta Advantage, You Say Party! We Say Die!, Think About Life, Mark Berube and The Few, Elisapie Isaac, Two Hours Traffic, Silly Kissers, DD/MM/YYYY, Parlovr, Silver Starling, Le Matos, Automelodi, La patère rose, Géraldine, Orange Orange, Xavier Caféïne, Misstress Barbara, Melissa Auf Der Maur,  Champion et ses G-Strings

2010 Edition
The Barr Brothers, Alex Nevsky, Misteur Valaire, Elephant Stone, Marco Calliari, Jason Bajada, PS. I Love You, Black Feelings, AIDS Wolf, Molly Rankin, METZ, Valleys, Suuns, Random Recipe, Courtney Wing, Ladies Of The Canyon, Ensemble, Leif Vollebekk, Yann Perreault, Les Surveillantes, La Patère Rose, Geneviève Toupin, Monogrenade, Jesuslesfilles, Damien Robitaille, The Dears, Pascale Picard Band, Priestess, POIRIER

2011 Edition
Karkwa, Bran Van 3000, Ariane Moffatt, Misteur Valaire, Random Recipe, Duchesse Says, Active Child, Galaxie, M83, Alfa Rococo, The Barr Brothers, Jimmy Hunt, Alexandre Désilets, The Midway State, Bobby Bazini, Plaster, Fanny Bloom, Karim Ouellet, Marie-Pierre Arthur, Peter Peter, Alaclair Ensemble, Hollerado, Parlovr, Cadence Weapon, Creature Claass, Young Empires, Ben Wilkins, D’eon, Prince Club, Half Moon Run, Uncle Bad Touch, Passwords, Trigger Effect, Adam and Amethusts, Absolutely Free, Barn Burner, Doldrums, Tonstartssbandht, For A Minor Reflection, Of Monsters and Men, Buddy McNeil & The Magic Mirrors, Canailles, Daniel Isaiah, Elephant Stone, Anoraak, Thus :Owls, I.No, Ed Wood Jr. Lena Deluxe, Concrete Knives, Lack Of Sleep, Leafer, Marième, Qualité Motel, Ango, Foxtrott

2012 Edition
Les Trois Accords, Plants and Animals, SoCalled, Death Grips, Of Monsters and Men, Bran Van 3000, The Mistress Barbara Band, Koriass, Half Moon Run, Suuns, MemoryHouse, Eight and a Half, Esmerine, A Place To Bury Strangers, Sun Airway, Yamantaka // Sonic Titan, Mac DeMarco, Cadence Weapon, Mykki Blanco, Philippe B, David Giguère, Elisapie, Plaster, Danger, Le Matos, Paper Diamond, Duchesse Says, Sóley, Webster, Loud Lary Ajust, Leif Vollebekk, Whitehorse, Young Galaxy, Man Forever, Odonis Odonis, Folly and the Hunter, Maïa Leia, Ian Kelly, Kandle, No Joy, PS I Love You, Ain’t No Love, Alexandre Désilets, Bleeding Rainbow, Cousins...

2013 Edition
Misteur Valaire, Mac DeMarco, Gros Méné, Thundercat, Kandle, Born Ruffians, Laura Mvula, Dusted, Groenland, Damien Robitaille, A Wilhelm Scream, Forêt, Dead Obies, Ponctuation, Black Atlass, Seoul, Young Galaxy, Duchess Says, We Are Wolves, A Tribe Called Red, Pawa Up First, Tommy Kruise, Majical Cloudz, Yamantaka // Sonic Titan, Murray Lightburn, Grand Analog, Foxtrott, The Lemming Ways, Technical Kidman, Odonis Odonis, Solar Year, The Damn Truth, Amelia Curran, Mark Berube, Elliot Maginot, Miracles, Random Recipe, Paul Langlois, The Beaches, M for Meral, Thus:Owls, Tops, Deluxe, Clément Jacques, Lakes of Canada, Les Jupes, Mardi Noir...

2014 Edition
Adrian Underhill, Antoine 93, Alex Calder, APigeon, A L L I E, Around Joshua, BadBadNotGood, Bernhari, Beat Cops, Betty Bonifassi, Beat Market, Blood & Glass, Ben UFO, Bonvivant, Caravane, Canaille, Choses Sauvages, Christ, Cri, Close Talker, CTZNSHP, Dakhabrakha, Cocobeurre, Dave Luxe, Country, Dawn of Midi, Dead Messenger, Diamond Bones, Dead Obies, Doomsquad, Dear Criminals, Dot, Les Deuxluxes, Dramatik, Each Other, Elephant Stone, Eagle Tears, Elliot Maginot, El Napoleon, Eternal Husbands, Eman x Vloopers, Fanny Bloom, Emilie & Odgen, Fallstaf, Essaie pas, ¡FLIST!, Foreign Diplomats, Gazelle Twin, Grimskunk, Gulfer, Half Truth, GyPSy kuMBIA ORChESTRA, Heat, High Ends, Holy Data, Holy Family, Hua Li, Home Shake, How Sad, James Irwin, JJanice+, Jack Name, Joy Orbison, July Talk, Kandle and the Krooks, Katie Moore, Klô Pelgag , L.A. Foster, Le Couleur, Le Trouble, Lemon Bucket Orchestra, Les Sins, Les Zerreurs, Light Fires, Lisa Leblanc, Little Scream, Lydia Ainsworth, Loud Lary Ajust, M-City Solo, Martin Lizotte, Mehdi Cayenne Club, Melt MTL, Milk & Bone, Mise en scène, Moon King, Mozart’s Sister, Narrative Crows, New Swears, Nils Frahm, Ohara, Operators, Pat Jordache, PyPy, Quintron And Miss Pussycat, Receivers, R.E.K.S, Ryan Playground, Sandveiss, Sean Nicholas, Savage, Secret Secret Girl, Secret Sun, Seoul, Slaves on Dope, Slow Down Molasses, Syngja, Syzzors, Technical Kidman, Teenanger, Tei Shi, Thee Oh Sees, The Blind Shake, The Celestics, The Damn Truth, The Dying Arts, The Franklin Electric, The Group Sound, The In and Outs, The Lovely Feathers, The Loodies, The Motor League, The Muscadettes, The OBGMs, The Posterz, Tommy Kruise, Unbeing, USA Out of Vietnam, UUBBUURRUU Vesuvio Solo, VioleTT Pi, Wake Island, Weaves, Wrekmeister Harmonies, Yes We Mystics

Accolades
Rencontrer la bonne personne au bon moment, dit l'adage. À M pour Montréal, il y a beaucoup de «bonnes personnes» à rencontrer. – Émilie Côté,  La Presse

The festival, although small and packed over a few short days, seemed to offer a genuine taste of what the music scene in Montreal is like.   – Noisey (Vice) 

(...) it's a quirky, off-kilter little festival that's grown quite a bit in recent years. – Noisey (Vice) 

The beauty of M for Montreal isn’t that they try to reinvent the festival, but that they streamline it and find efficiencies wherever possible. In its ninth year, the festival excels at presenting music fans with an endless stream of concerts that have all been programmed to be as accessible as possible.   –  Noisey (Vice) 

A sprawling fusion of language, culture, style and taste, Montreal is – culturally and politically – one of Canada’s most important cities. / Held in venues across the historic port, M For Montreal is every bit as varied as the city itself. Clash is busy exploring a labyrinthine complex of venues, turning up a few surprises in the process.   – Robyn Murray, CLASH 

Plus qu’un festival de musique traditionnel, M pour Montréal est une créature hybride qui étend ses tentacules dans divers quartiers de la ville pour dévoiler un best of de la scène musicale canadienne, en anglais et en français.  – Marie-Hélène Mello, RFI Musique

What the festival showed more than anything was a country’s music scene in rude health (...). There’s a lot going on here, spanning genres often not associated with the city.  – Luke Holland, The Guardian 

La deuxième ville du Canada domine la scène musicale mondiale grâce à une activité et une diversité déconcertante. L’effet de mode est passé, l’incroyable vitalité culturelle de la ville perdure. Années après années, tendances après tendances, Montréal continue à distribuer des dizaines d’excitations, incarnées par autant de nouveaux groupes qu’il y a de salles sur le boulevard Saint-Laurent.  – Azzedine Fall, Les Inrocks

C’est dans ce contexte ultraconcurrentiel que M pour Montréal, pourtant arrivé après bien d’autres, est parvenu à se tailler une réputation des plus flatteuses, au beau milieu d’autres concentrations musicales majeures.  – Gilles Renault, Libération

References

External links
 M for Montreal
 M on Facebook
 M on Twitter
 M on Instagram

Music festivals in Montreal
Music conferences
Cultural conferences